Cookeconcha contorta is a species of very small, air-breathing land snail, a terrestrial pulmonate gastropod mollusk in the family Endodontidae.

Distribution
This species is found only in Hawaii, and is threatened by habitat loss.

References

Endodontidae
Gastropods described in 1825
Taxonomy articles created by Polbot